Shoshone Airport  is a public/civil-use airport located one mile (1.6 km) south of Shoshone, in Inyo County, California, United States.

Although most U.S. airports use the same three-letter location identifier for the FAA and IATA, Shoshone Airport is assigned L61 by the FAA but has no designation from the IATA.

Facilities 

References

External links 

Airports in Inyo County, California